Clarity Partners, LP is a private equity firm headquartered in Los Angeles, California that focuses on investments in media, telecommunications and business services. Clarity Partners also manages an affiliated China investment private equity fund.

Clarity Partners was founded in 1999. The firm has over $1 billion of assets under management and is among the largest media and telecom focused funds in the Western United States.

Senior Investment Professionals at Clarity Include: David Lee, Barry Porter, Stephen Rader, Rudolph Reinfrank, Joshua Gutfreund, Clinton Walker, Erez Barnavon, and Leo Griffin.

Notable past and present investments
 Oxygen Media, a women's cable channel
 ImpreMedia, a Hispanic newspaper publisher in the US, publishing newspapers such as La Opinión, El Diario and Hoy
 Village Roadshow, a producer of movies such as The Matrix and Happy Feet
 Modern Luxury Media, a publisher of city magazines
 MetroPCS, a  flat rate mobile telephony provider
 Opnext, an optical laser component supplier, spun out of Hitachi and listed on NASDAQ 
 TelePacific Communications, a CLEC in California

References

External links 
Company Website

Financial services companies established in 2000
Private equity firms of the United States
Companies based in Los Angeles